This is a list of the tallest buildings in Windsor, Ontario, the second largest city in Southwestern Ontario in Canada.

None of Windsor's tallest buildings are among the tallest in Canada, but are generally taller than the tallest buildings in the Windsor's nearby neighbours, St. Catherines and Kitchener, though London's tallest building is the tallest in the southwest. This may partly be explained by the fact that Windsor is directly across the border from Detroit, Michigan, a metropolitan area of over 4 million people. The gambling and drinking laws in Canada are more lax than in the USA so many young Americans cross over the Ambassador bridge for some fun.

The tallest building in the city is the 27-storey,  Caesars Windsor Augustus Tower.

, the city has no structures under construction or proposed.

Buildings 

This list ranks buildings in Windsor that stand at least 50 m (164 ft) tall, based on CTBUH height measurement standards. This includes spires and architectural details but does not include antenna masts.

See also

Canadian architecture
List of tallest buildings in Ontario

External links
Windsor Map
Windsor skyscraperpage
Windsor timeline

References

Windsor, Ontario
 
Tallest buildings in Windsor